The Solomon Gans House is a historic house at 1010 West 3rd Street in Little Rock, Arkansas.  It is a -story masonry structure, built out of rusticated granite.  Its front is dominated by a two-arched porch, and there is a turret with a bell-shaped roof on the right side.  Built in 1896, it the only known local residence to be built in the Romanesque Revival style.

The house was listed on the National Register of Historic Places in 1984.

See also
National Register of Historic Places listings in Little Rock, Arkansas

References

Houses on the National Register of Historic Places in Arkansas
Romanesque Revival architecture in Arkansas
Houses completed in 1896
Houses in Little Rock, Arkansas
National Register of Historic Places in Little Rock, Arkansas